François Sagat (born 5 June 1979) is a French male gay pornographic film actor, model and director.

Adult film career
At the age of twenty-five Sagat performed in his first adult film under the screen name Azzedine.

After several films with Citébeur as Azzedine, he moved to the USA and, there, shot his first scene for the porn film Arabesque by Raging Stallion Studios using his birth name.

He stayed with Raging Stallion Studios from 2005 to 2006 before becoming an exclusive porn star at Titan Media.

As a pornographic actor, he was both top and bottom and also performed BDSM. He has also appeared in a few bisexual and heterosexual scenes.

In October 2011, Sagat directed of a two-part porn film series Incubus for TitanMen. In support of the film, TitanMen in November 2011 released, a 33-minute making-of documentary.

In 2017, after having retired for 3 years, Sagat returned to film with the studio Men.com playing Aquaman in a parody of the 2017 movie Justice League.

In May 2018, Sagat joined adult pay-to-subscribe website Just for Fans.

Non-pornographic career
In 2009, he appeared as an extra in Saw VI.

In 2010, he appeared in a zombie porn film directed by Bruce LaBruce in the lead role in L.A. Zombie where he plays role of a homeless schizophrenic man.

He appears in the lead role in Homme au bain (in English Man in Bath) directed by Christophe Honoré.

Both L.A. Zombie and Homme au bain premiered at Locarno International Film Festival in Switzerland in 2010, making François Sagat the only actor with two lead roles featured in two competition entries during the festival. L.A. Zombie was also due to be screened during the Melbourne International Film Festival in Australia but was banned due to a ruling by Australia's Film Classification Board.

Documentaries
In 2007, he appeared with other personalities in Olivier Nicklaus documentary about nudity in culture entitled La nudité toute nue.

In March 2011, a documentary entitled Sagat: The Documentary, a joint Brenda & Lucy Co./ADL TV/Canal+ production exploring the Sagat persona and phenomenon on world culture trends.

Marketing, fashion and music

Sagat adult toys were marketed including dildos made from an exact molding of Sagat's genitalia.

When German designer Bernhard Willhelm launched his first menswear collection during Paris Fashion Week, he chose Sagat to promote the event. This turned into a series François Sagat Classics wear. Selected photographs also appeared as calendars. The series was photographed by Lukas Wassmann. Sagat has also worked with the French fashion label Fade.

Sagat is involved in fashion photoshoots. American fashion photographer Terry Richardson made a military-themed photoshoot of Sagat.

In March 2012, he launched a musical project entitled Hadès with Sylvia Gobbel. The music video debuted in March 2011.

Since 2013, Sagat announced his own on-line clothing brand named KICKSAGAT in association with workpartner PH. Sagat did all the designing.

Personal life
François Sagat was born in Cognac to French parents of Slovak ancestry. Sagat moved to Paris at the age of eighteen.

He is the cousin of English singer Alison Moyet. Sagat is bisexual and currently lives in France. Sagat is known for his distinctive scalp tattoo.

Discography

EPs

Singles

Filmography

Non-pornographic

Music Videos

Advertisements

Pornographic

Director / Producer
2011: François Sagat's Incubus – Part 1
2012: François Sagat's Incubus – Part 2

Actor

Citébeur
2005: Wesh Cousin 5 – Relax man (featuring the first porn video of François Sagat)
2005: Wesh Cousin 6 – Cho bouillants
2005: Univers Black 1 – Matos de blackoss (at UniversBlack.com associated with Citébeur)
2006: Wesh Cousin 7 – C'est d'la balle

Diapopic
2005: François Sagat : Le DVD
2005: Pompiers mis à nu
2005: Pompiers mis à nu 2

Raging Stallion
2005: Manifesto
2005: Hard As Wood
2005: Knight After Night
2005: Hole Sweet Hole
2006: Bedroom Eyes
2006: Manhattan
2006: Fistpack 7: Twist My Arm
2006: Fistpack 8 : Elbow Room
2006: Centurion Muscle II – Alpha
2006: Escape From San Francisco
2006: Tough As Nails
2006: Arabesque
2006: Lebanon (or Collin O'Neal's World of Men: Lebanon)
2006: Humping Iron
2006: Stretch
2006: Apex
2007: Best in Hole
2007: Instinct
2007: Boners
2007: The Best of François Sagat – Volume 1
2007: The Best of François Sagat – Volume 2
2008: The Best of François Sagat – Volume 3
2008: Hairy Boyz 10

2009: Piss Off : Hardcore Fetish Series: Pissing #1
2009: Muscle Studs 2
2009: Fistpack 24: The Best of François Sagat: Fisting
2010: Hairy Boyz 15
2010: Inked Boyz 2

Titan Media
2007: Stretch
2007: Folsom Leather
2007: Shacked Up
2007: H2O
2007: SPY Quest 3
2007: Breathless
2007: Folsom Filth
2008: Telescope
2008: Breakers
2008: Fear
2008: Double Standard
2008: Telescope
2008: P.O.V.
2008: Funhouse
2009: OverDrive
2009: Full Access
2010: Search and Rescue
2010: Thrust
2011: François Sagat's Incubus – Part 1
2012: François Sagat's Incubus – Part 2

Falcon Studios
2009: Ringside

Overload Releasing
2010: Cock Hungry Dick Pigs!

Awards and nominations

Wins
2006: Best European actor at the David Awards
2007: Best Performer of the Year at the GayVN Awards
2008: Best Threesome Performance at European Gay Porn Awards (together with Steve Cruz & Rocky Torrez in H2O)
In 2010, he won the award for Best Hair at TLA Gay Awards 2010
In 2011, he won the award for Best European performer at HustlaBall Award

Nominations
François Sagat has been nominated for many GayVN and Grabby Awards.
2006: Best Duo Sex Scene ((shared with Huessein) for Arabesque (at the Grabby Awards)
2007: Best Performer, Best Bottom, Best Solo Sex Scene (for Manhattan), Best Duo Sex Scene (shared with Kyle Lewis) for Bedroom Eyes, Best Three-Way Sex Scene (shared with Collin O'Neal and Jacko) for Lebanon at the Grabby Awards
2008: Best Threesome (shared with Brendan Davies and Rick Van Sant) for Folsom Leather at GayVN Awards
2019: Gay Performer of the Year XBIZ awards

See also
List of male performers in gay porn films

Notes
Beautiful blog: A Raging Stallion
Beautiful blog: The Man Behind the Mask (part 2)
Un Nouveau Idéal: François Sagat talks to Filep Notwary

References

External links
 Official François Sagat website
 Official KICKSAGAT fashion website
 FrancoisSagat.fr – first videos of Francois Sagat by citebeur
 
 
 

 

1979 births
Living people
People from Cognac, France
French expatriates in Canada
French expatriates in the United States
French male film actors
French people of Slovak descent
Gay pornographic film actors
French gay actors
Gay models
French pornographic film directors
French pornographic film producers
Directors of gay pornographic films
Producers of gay pornographic films
Actors in gay pornographic films
French male pornographic film actors